is a passenger railway station located in the town of Moroyama, Saitama, Japan, operated by the private railway operator Tōbu Railway.

Lines
During the daytime, the station is served by four trains per hour in each direction.

Station layout

The station consists of two side platforms serving two tracks forming a passing loop on the single-track line. The station entrance is located on the northern (Sakado-bound) side of the station. Lifts were added in 2009.

Platforms

Adjacent stations

History
The station opened on 16 December 1934, initially as an unstaffed station. It became a staffed station on 17 May 1965. A second platform and passing loop was added in August 1987.

Platform edge sensors and TV monitors were installed in 2008 ahead of the start of driver-only operation on the Ogose Line from June 2008.

From 17 March 2012, station numbering was introduced on the Tōbu Ogose Line, with Kawakado Station becoming "TJ-43".

Passenger statistics
In fiscal 2019, the station was used by an average of 14,584 passengers daily.

Surrounding area

The station is close to the campuses of three universities: Josai University, Meikai University (Sakado Campus), and Nihon Institute of Medical Science. The large number of students using the line makes this station the busiest on the Ogose Line second only to Sakado Station. The station is also close to the Saitama Heisei Junior and Senior High Schools.

Bus services
Kawakado Station is served by the "Moro Bus" community minibus (Yuzu Yellow Line) service operated by the town of Moro, and also by the "Sakacchi Bus" (Ōya Line) and "Sakacchi Wagon" (Nissai Line) community minibus services operated by the city of Sakado.

See also
 List of railway stations in Japan

References

External links

  

Stations of Tobu Railway
Tobu Ogose Line
Railway stations in Saitama Prefecture
Railway stations in Japan opened in 1934
Moroyama, Saitama